These are the Billboard magazine Hot Dance Airplay number-one hits of 2007.

Note that Billboard publishes charts with an issue date approximately 7–10 days in advance.

See also
2007 in music

References

United States Dance Airplay
2007